Mit Salsil is a city in the Dakahlia Governorate, Egypt. Its population was estimated at 47,000 people in 2020.

The old name of the city is Minyat Ibn Salsil.

References 

Populated places in Dakahlia Governorate